Just One Night may refer to:

 Just One Night (Eric Clapton album), 1980
 Just One Night (Samantha Fox album), or the title song, 1991
 "Just One Night" (song), a song by McBride & the Ride
 "Just One Night", a song by Triumph from The Sport of Kings
 Just One Night (1934 film), a 1934 Chinese film 
 Just One Night (film), a 2000 film starring Timothy Hutton
 Just One Night (short film), a 2019 film directed by Sahar Jahani